The Special Air Service (SAS) is a special forces unit of the British Army. It was founded as a regiment in 1941 by David Stirling and in 1950, it was reconstituted as a corps. The unit specialises in a number of roles including counter-terrorism, hostage rescue, direct action and covert reconnaissance. Much of the information about the SAS is highly classified, and the unit is not commented on by either the British government or the Ministry of Defence due to the secrecy and sensitivity of its operations.

The corps currently consists of the 22 Special Air Service Regiment, the regular component, as well as the 21 Special Air Service Regiment (Artists) (Reserve) and the 23 Special Air Service Regiment (Reserve), which are reserve units, all under the operational command of United Kingdom Special Forces (UKSF). Its sister unit is the Royal Navy's Special Boat Service which specialises in maritime counter-terrorism. Both units are under the operational control of the Director Special Forces.

The Special Air Service traces its origins to 1941 and the Second World War. It was reformed as part of the Territorial Army in 1947, named the 21st Special Air Service Regiment (Artists Rifles). The 22nd Special Air Service Regiment, which is part of the regular army, gained fame and recognition worldwide after its televised rescue of all but two of the hostages held during the 1980 Iranian Embassy siege.

History

Second World War
The Special Air Service was a unit of the British Army during the Second World War that was formed in July 1941 by David Stirling and originally called "L" Detachment, Special Air Service Brigade—the "L" designation and Air Service name being a tie-in to a British disinformation campaign, trying to deceive the Axis into thinking there was a paratrooper regiment with numerous units operating in the area (the real SAS would "prove" to the Axis that the fake one existed). It was conceived as a commando force to operate behind enemy lines in the North African Campaign and initially consisted of five officers and 60 other ranks. Its first mission, in November 1941, was a parachute drop in support of the Operation Crusader offensive, codenamed Operation Squatter. Due to German resistance and adverse weather conditions, the mission was a disaster; 22 men, a third of the unit, were killed or captured. Its second mission was a major success. Transported by the Long Range Desert Group, it attacked three airfields in Libya, destroying 60 aircraft without loss. In September 1942, it was renamed 1st SAS, consisting at that time of four British squadrons, one Free French, one Greek, and the Folboat Section.

In January 1943, Colonel Stirling was captured in Tunisia and Paddy Mayne replaced him as commander. In April 1943, the 1st SAS was reorganised into the Special Raiding Squadron under Mayne's command and the Special Boat Squadron was placed under the command of George Jellicoe. The Special Raiding Squadron fought in Sicily and Italy along with the 2nd SAS, which had been formed in North Africa in 1943 in part by the renaming of the Small Scale Raiding Force. The Special Boat Squadron fought in the Aegean Islands and Dodecanese until the end of the war. In 1944 the SAS Brigade was formed. The unit was formed from: 
1st Special Air Service 
2nd Special Air Service 
3rd Special Air Service - 2e Régiment de Chasseurs Parachutistes
4th Special Air Service - 3e Régiment de Chasseurs Parachutistes
5th Special Air Service - lineage continued by Belgian Special Forces Group
F Squadron - responsible for signals and communications

It was tasked with parachute operations behind the German lines in France and carried out operations supporting the Allied advance through France, (Operations Houndsworth, Bulbasket, Loyton and Wallace-Hardy) Belgium, the Netherlands (Operation Pegasus), and eventually into Germany (Operation Archway). As a result of Hitler's issuing of the Commando Order on 18 October 1942, the members of the unit faced the additional danger that they would be summarily executed if captured by the Germans. In July 1944, following Operation Bulbasket, 34 captured SAS commandos were summarily executed by the Germans. In October 1944, in the aftermath of Operation Loyton another 31 captured SAS commandos were summarily executed by the Germans.

Post-war
At the end of the war the British government saw no further need for the force and disbanded it on 8 October 1945.

The following year it was decided there was a need for a long-term deep-penetration commando unit and a new SAS regiment was to be raised as part of the Territorial Army. Ultimately, the Artists Rifles, raised in 1860 and headquartered at Dukes Road, Euston, took on the SAS mantle as 21st SAS Regiment (V) on 1 January 1947.

Malayan Scouts

In 1950, a 21 SAS squadron was raised to fight in the Korean War. After three months of training in Britain, it was informed that the squadron would no longer be required in Korea and so it instead volunteered to fight in the Malayan Emergency. Upon arrival in Malaya, it came under the command of "Mad Mike" Mike Calvert who was forming a new unit called the Malayan Scouts (SAS). Calvert had already formed one squadron from 100 volunteers in the Far East, which became A Squadron; the 21 SAS squadron then became B Squadron; and after a recruitment visit to Rhodesia by Calvert, C Squadron was formed from 100 Rhodesian volunteers. The Rhodesians returned home after three years' service and were replaced by a New Zealand squadron. By this time the need for a regular army SAS regiment had been recognised; the 22 SAS Regiment was formally added to the army list in 1952 and has been based at Hereford since 1960. In 1959 the third regiment, the 23 SAS Regiment, was formed by renaming the Reserve Reconnaissance Unit, which had succeeded MI9 and whose members were experts in escape and evasion.

22 SAS Regiment
Since serving in Malaya, men from the regular army 22 SAS Regiment have taken part in reconnaissance patrols and large scale raiding missions in the Jebel Akhdar War in Oman and conducted covert reconnaissance and surveillance patrols and some larger scale raiding missions in Borneo. They returned to Oman in operations against Communist-backed rebels in the Dhofar Rebellion including the Battle of Mirbat. They have also taken part in operations in the Aden Emergency, Northern Ireland, and Gambia. Their Special projects team assisted the West German counterterrorism group GSG 9 at Mogadishu. The SAS counter terrorist wing famously took part in a hostage rescue operation during the Iranian Embassy Siege in London. SAS were involved throughout Britain's covert involvement in the Soviet–Afghan War; they acted through private military contractor Keenie Meenie Services (or KMS Ltd), training the Afghan Mujaheddin in weapons, tactics and using explosives. Not only did they train the Mujaheddin in Afghanistan but also sent them to be trained in Pakistan, Oman and even parts of the UK. During the Falklands War B squadron were prepared for Operation Mikado before it was subsequently cancelled while D and G squadrons were deployed and participated in the raid on Pebble Island. Operation Flavius was a controversial operation in Gibraltar against the Provisional Irish Republican Army (PIRA). 22 SAS also directed NATO aircraft onto Serb positions and hunted war criminals in Bosnia. They were also involved in the Kosovo War helping KLA guerillas behind Serbian lines. According to Albanian sources one SAS sergeant was killed by Serbian special forces.

The Gulf War, in which A, B and D squadrons deployed, was the largest SAS mobilisation since the Second World War, also notable for the failure of the Bravo Two Zero mission. In Sierra Leone it took part in Operation Barras, a hostage rescue operation, to extract members of the Royal Irish Regiment.

Following the September 11 attacks on the United States by al-Qaeda in 2001, 2 squadrons of 22 SAS, later reinforced by members of both the Territorial SAS units, deployed to Afghanistan as part of the Coalition invasion at the start of the War in Afghanistan, to dismantle and destroy al-Qaeda and to deny it a safe base of operations in Afghanistan by removing the Taliban from power in the War on Terror. The Regiment carried out Operation Trent, the largest operation in its history, which included its first wartime HALO parachute jump. Following the invasion, the Regiment continued to operate in Afghanistan against the Taliban and other insurgents until 2006, when its deployment to Iraq became its focus of operations, until 2009 when the SAS redeployed to Afghanistan.

The regiment took part in the Iraq War, notably carrying out operations in Iraq before the 2003 invasion. Following the invasion, it formed part of Task Force Black/Knight to combat the postinvasion insurgency; in late 2005/early 2006, the SAS were integrated into JSOC and focused its counterinsurgency efforts on combating al-Qaeda in Iraq and the Sunni insurgency alongside Delta Force. The counter-insurgency was successful, and the UKSF mission in Iraq ended in May 2009. Overall, more than 3,500 terrorists were "taken off the streets" of Baghdad by 22 SAS.

Various British newspapers have speculated on SAS involvement in Operation Ellamy and the 2011 Libyan civil war. The Daily Telegraph reports that "defence sources have confirmed that the SAS has been in Libya for several weeks, and played a key role in coordinating the fall of Tripoli." While The Guardian reports "They have been acting as forward air controllers—directing pilots to targets—and communicating with NATO operational commanders. They have also been advising rebels on tactics."

Members of the Special Air Service were deployed to Northern Iraq in late August 2014, and according to former MI6 chief Richard Barrett, would also be sent to Syria, tasked with trying to track down the Islamic State of Iraq and the Levant (ISIL) terrorist group that the press labelled the Beatles.

In recent years SAS officers have risen to senior appointments in the British Army and Armed Forces. General Peter de la Billière was the commander in chief of the British forces in the 1990 Gulf War. General Michael Rose became commander of the United Nations Protection Force in Bosnia in 1994. In 1997 General Charles Guthrie became Chief of the Defence Staff the head of the British armed forces. Lieutenant-General Cedric Delves was appointed commander of the Field Army and deputy commander in chief NATO Regional Headquarters Allied Forces North in 2002–2003.

21 and 23 SAS

For much of the Cold War, the role of 21 SAS and 23 SAS was to provide stay-behind parties in the event of a Warsaw Pact invasion of western Europe, forming together I Corps' Corps Patrol Unit. In the case of an invasion, this Special Air Service Group would have let themselves be bypassed and remained behind in order to collect intelligence behind Warsaw Pact lines, conduct target acquisition, and thus try to slow the enemy's advance.

By early 2003 a composite squadron of 21 and 23 SAS, was operating in Helmand for roles against Al Qaeda forces, ‘with the emphasis on long range reconnaissance'  
In 2007–08 a squadron-sized sub-unit was deployed first from 23 and then from 21 SAS to Helmand for roles including training the Afghan Police and working with the intelligence services.

Influence on other special forces
Following the post-war reconstitution of the Special Air Service, other countries in the Commonwealth recognised their need for similar units. The Canadian Special Air Service Company was formed in 1947, being disbanded in 1949. The New Zealand Special Air Service squadron was formed in June 1955 to serve with the British SAS in Malaya, which became a full regiment in 2011. Australia formed the 1st SAS Company in July 1957, which became a full regiment of the Special Air Service Regiment (SASR) in 1964. On its return from Malaya, the C (Rhodesian) Squadron formed the basis for creation of the Rhodesian Special Air Service in 1961. It retained the name "C Squadron (Rhodesian) Special Air Service" within the Rhodesian Security Forces until 1978, when it became 1 (Rhodesian) Special Air Service Regiment.

Non-Commonwealth countries have also formed units based on the SAS. The Belgian Army's Special Forces Group, which wears the same capbadge as the British SAS, traces its ancestry partly from the 5th Special Air Service of the Second World War. The French 1st Marine Infantry Parachute Regiment (1er RPIMa) can trace its origins to the Second World War 3rd and 4th SAS, adopting its "who dares wins" motto. The American unit, 1st Special Forces Operational Detachment-Delta, was formed by Colonel Charles Alvin Beckwith, who served with 22 SAS as an exchange officer, and recognised the need for a similar type of unit in the United States Army. The Israeli Sayeret Matkal and Shaldag units have also been modelled after the SAS, sharing its motto. Ireland's Army Ranger Wing (ARW) has also modelled its training on that of the SAS. The Philippine National Police's Special Action Force was formed along the lines of the SAS.

The former Royal Afghan Army's 666th Commando Brigade was formed by Colonel Ramatullah Safi in the 1970s after he received his training with the SAS before it was disbanded through purges after the coups in 1973 and 1978.

Organisation

Little publicly verifiable information exists on the contemporary SAS, as the British government usually does not comment on special forces matters due to the nature of their work. The Special Air Service comprises three units: one Regular and two Army Reserve (AR) units. The regular army unit is 22 SAS Regiment and the reserve units are 21 Special Air Service Regiment (Artists) (Reserve) (21 SAS(R)) and 23 Special Air Service Regiment (23 SAS (R)), collectively, the Special Air Service (Reserve) (SAS(R)).

Special Forces Parachute Support Squadron (Para Sp Sqn) is a sub-unit of the Airborne Delivery Wing (ADW) based at RAF Brize Norton.

Supplementary to the SAS, together with the Special Boat Service and the Special Reconnaissance Regiment is 18 (UKSF) Signal Regiment.

Squadrons

22 SAS normally has a strength of 400 to 600. The regiment has four operational squadrons: A, B, D and G. Each squadron consists of approximately 65 members commanded by a major, divided into four troops (each troop being commanded by a captain) and a small headquarters section. Troops usually consist of 16 members (Members of the SAS are variously known as "blade" or "Operator") and each patrol within a troop consists of four members, with each member possessing a particular skill e.g. signals, demolition, medic or linguist in addition to basic skills learned during the course of his training. The term "squadron" dates back to the unit's earliest days when the unit's name was intended to confuse German intelligence. The four troops specialise in four different areas:

 Boat troop – specialists in maritime skills including diving using rebreathers, using kayaks (canoes) and Rigid-hulled inflatable boats and often train with the Special Boat Service.
 Air troop – experts in free fall parachuting and high-altitude parachute operations including High-Altitude Low Opening (HALO) and High-Altitude High Opening (HAHO) techniques.
 Mobility troop – specialists in using vehicles and are experts in desert warfare. They are also trained in an advanced level of motor mechanics to field-repair any vehicular breakdown.
 Mountain troop – specialists in Arctic combat and survival, using specialist equipment such as skis, snowshoes and mountain climbing techniques.

In 1980 R Squadron (which has since been renamed L Detachment) was formed; its members are all ex-regular SAS regiment soldiers who have a commitment to reserve service.

22 SAS squadron duty rotations are set up as such that one squadron is maintained on Counter-Terrorism duty in the UK; a second will be on a deployment; a third will be preparing for deployment whilst conducting short term training; and the fourth will be preparing for long-term overseas training such as jungle or desert exercises. In times of war, such as the 2003 invasion of Iraq, it is not uncommon for two squadrons to be deployed.

Squadron Structure:

 A Squadron: 1 (Boat) Troop – 2 (Air) Troop – 3 (Mobility) Troop – 4 (Mountain) Troop
 B Squadron: 6 (Boat) Troop – 7 (Air) Troop – 8 (Mobility) Troop – 9 (Mountain) Troop
 D Squadron: 16 (Air) Troop – 17 (Boat) Troop – 18 (Mobility) Troop – 19 (Mountain) Troop
 G Squadron: 21 (Mobility) Troop – 22 (Mountain) Troop – 23 (Boat) Troop – 24 (Air) Troop

Counter Terrorist Wing

The SAS has a subunit called the Counter Terrorist Wing (CTW) that fulfils its counterterrorism (CT) role. It has previously been known as the Counter Revolutionary Warfare (CRW) Wing and special projects team. The SAS receives aviation support from No. 658 Squadron AAC to carry out their CT role.

The CTW is trained in Close Quarter Battle (CQB), sniper techniques and specialises in hostage rescue in buildings or on public transport. The team was formed in the early 1970s after the Prime Minister, Edward Heath, asked the Ministry of Defence to prepare for any possible terrorist attack similar to the massacre at the 1972 Summer Olympics therefore ordering that the SAS Counter Revolutionary Warfare (CRW) wing be raised.

Squadrons refresh their training every 16 months, on average. The CRW's first deployment was during the Balcombe Street siege. The Metropolitan Police had trapped a PIRA unit; it surrendered when it heard on the BBC that the SAS were being sent in. The first documented action abroad by the CRW wing was assisting the West German counter-terrorism group GSG 9 at Mogadishu.

The CT role was shared amongst the squadrons, initially on a 12-month and later six-month rotation basis to ensure that all members are eventually trained in CT and CQB techniques. The SAS train for the CT role at Pontrilas Army Training Area in a facility that includes the Killing House (officially known as Close Quarter Battle House) and part of a Boeing 747 airliner that can be reconfigured to match the internal layouts of virtually any commercial aircraft. The on-call CT squadron is split into four troops, two of which are on immediate notice to move and are restricted to the Hereford-Credenhill area, whilst the other two conduct training and exercises across the UK, but are available for operational deployment should the need arise.

Commanding Officers

 1950 Lt Col Mike Calvert, Royal Engineers
 1951 Lt Col John Slone, Argyll and Sutherland Highlanders
 1953 Lt Col Oliver Brooke, Welch Regiment
 1954 Lt Col Michael Osborn, West Yorkshire Regiment
 1955 Lt Col George Lea, Lancashire Fusiliers and Parachute Regiment
 1957 Lt Col Tony Deane-Drummond, Royal Signals
 1960 Lt Col Ronald Wilson, Royal Northumberland Fusiliers
 1962 Lt Col John Woodhouse, Dorset Regiment and East Surreys
 1965 Lt Col Michael Wingate-Gray, Black Watch
 1967 Lt Col John Slim, Argyll and Sutherland Highlanders
 1969 Lt Col John Watts, Royal Irish Rangers
 1972 Lt Col Peter de la Billière, Light Infantry
 1974 Lt Col Anthony Jeapes, Devonshire and Dorset Regiment
 1977 Lt Col Mike Wilkes, Royal Artillery
 1982 Lt Col Mike Rose, Coldstream Guards
 1984 Lt Col Andrew Massey, Royal Corps of Transport
 1986 Lt Col Cedric Delves, Devonshire and Dorset Regiment
 1989 Lt Col John Holmes, Scots Guards
 n/k Lt Col Jonathan "Jacko" Page, Parachute Regiment
 2001 Lt Col Ed Butler, Royal Green Jackets
 2002 Lt Col Mark Carleton-Smith, Irish Guards
 2007 Lt Col Richard Williams, Parachute Regiment
 2012 Lt Col Nick Perry, King's Royal Hussars

Operational command

Regular
22 SAS is under the operational command of the Director Special Forces (DSF), a major-general grade post. Previously ranked as a brigadier, the DSF was promoted from brigadier to major-general in recognition of the significant expansion of the United Kingdom Special Forces (UKSF).

Reserve
On 1 September 2014, 21 and 23 SAS were moved from UKSF  They were placed under command of 1st Intelligence, Surveillance and Reconnaissance Brigade. In 2019 they were moved back to UKSF.

Recruitment and training

The United Kingdom Special Forces do not recruit directly from the general public. All current members of the UK Armed Forces can apply for Special Forces selection, but the majority of candidates have historically come from a Royal Marines or Parachute Regiment background. Selections are held twice a year, once in summer and again in winter.

Taking place in Wales, specifically Sennybridge and the Brecon Beacons, selection lasts for five weeks and normally starts with approximately 200 potential candidates. Candidates complete a Personal Fitness Test (PFT) upon arrival, which consists of at least 50 sit-ups in two minutes, 60 press-ups in two minutes, and a  run in 10 minutes and 30 seconds. They then complete an Annual Fitness Test (AFT), which consists of marching  in two hours while carrying  of equipment. Candidates then march cross-country against the clock, increasing the distance covered each day; this culminates in an endurance test known as the "Endurance", in which candidates march  with full equipment before climbing up and down the mountain Pen y Fan (886 m; 2,907 ft) in 20 hours. By the end of this phase, candidates must then be able to run  in 30 minutes or less and swim  in 90 minutes or less.

Following mountain training, the jungle phase takes place in Belize, Brunei, or Malaysia. Candidates are taught navigation, patrol formation and movement, and jungle survival skills. They then return to the UK to begin training in battle plans and foreign weapons, and then take part in combat survival exercises, ending in week-long escape and evasion training. Candidates are formed into patrols and, with nothing more than a tin can filled with survival equipment, are dressed in World War II-era uniforms and told to head for a particular destination by sunrise. The final selection test, resistance to interrogation (RTI), lasts for 36 hours.

Typically only 10% of candidates make it through the initial selection process. From a group of approximately 200 candidates, most will drop out within the first few days, and fewer than 30 will remain by the end. Those who complete all phases of selection are transferred to an operational squadron.

For applicants to the reserve component, 21 SAS and 23 SAS, the pathway involves comparable elements, apart from jungle training, but taken in blocks, spread out over a longer period, to fit in with the demands of participants' civilian careers.

In October 2018, recruitment policy changed to allow women to become members of the SAS for the first time. In August 2021, two women became the first to pass the pre-selection course, making them eligible for the full course.

Uniform distinctions

Normal barracks headdress is the sand-coloured beret, its cap badge is a downward pointing Excalibur, wreathed in flames (often incorrectly referred to as a winged dagger) worked into the cloth of a Crusader shield with the motto Who Dares Wins. SAS pattern parachute wings, designed by Lieutenant Jock Lewes and based on the stylised sacred ibis of Isis of Egyptian iconography depicted in the décor of Shepheard's Hotel in Cairo, are worn on the right shoulder. Its ceremonial No 1 dress uniform is distinguished by a light-blue stripe on the trousers. Its stable belt is a shade of blue similar to the blue stripe on the No 1 dress uniform.

Battle honours
In the British Army, battle honours are awarded to regiments that have seen active service in a significant engagement or campaign, generally with a victorious outcome. The Special Air Service Regiment has been awarded the following battle honours:
North-West Europe 1944–45
Tobruk 1941
Benghazi Raid
North Africa 1940–43
Landing in Sicily
Sicily 1943
Termoli
Valli di Comacchio
Italy 1943–45
Greece 1944–45
Adriatic
Middle East 1943–44
Falkland Islands 1982
Western Iraq
Gulf 1991

Order of precedence

Memorials

The names of those members of the Regular SAS who have died on duty were inscribed on the regimental clock tower at Stirling Lines. Originally funded by contributions of a day's pay by members of the regiment and a donation from Handley Page in memory of Cpl. R.K. Norry who was killed in a freefall parachuting accident, this was rebuilt at the new barracks at Credenhill. Those whose names are inscribed are said by surviving members to have "failed to beat the clock". At the suggestion of the then Commanding Officer, Dare Wilson, inscribed on the base of the clock is a verse from The Golden Journey to Samarkand by James Elroy Flecker:

The other main memorial is the SAS and Airborne Forces memorial in the cloisters at Westminster Abbey. The SAS Brigade Memorial at Sennecey-le-Grand in France commemorates the wartime dead of the Belgian, British and French SAS and recently a memorial plaque was added to the David Stirling Memorial in Scotland. There are other smaller memorials "scattered throughout Europe and in the Far East".

The local church of St Martin's, Hereford has part of its graveyard set aside as an SAS memorial, over twenty SAS soldiers are buried there. There is also a wall of remembrance displaying memorial plaques to some who could not be buried, including the 18 SAS men who lost their lives in the Sea King helicopter crash during the Falklands Campaign on 19 May 1982 and a sculpture and stained glass window dedicated to the SAS.

On 17 October 2017 Ascension, a new sculpture and window honouring the Special Air Service Regiment in Hereford Cathedral, was dedicated by the Bishop of Hereford at a service attended by Prince William.

In popular culture
Books and films about the SAS
Eastern Approaches – Fitzroy Maclean's memoir provides his personal experiences in the fledgling SAS in the Western Desert Campaign.
Bravo Two Zero – a novel about a failed SAS mission by Andy McNab
Bravo Two Zero - a film based on the novel of the same name by Andy McNab.
Red Notice, a novel by Andy McNab, part of his Tom Buckingham Series
SAS: Red Notice - a 2021 film based on Andy McNab's novel Red Notice.
The One That Got Away - another novel about the Bravo Two Zero mission by Chris Ryan
The One That Got Away - a film based on the novel
The Feather Men a novel by Sir Ranulph Fiennes - claimed by the author to be a partly non-fictional story involving the SAS
Killer Elite - film based on The Feathermen, about a mercenary hired to kill SAS troopers (fictional story surrounding real events and people from SAS history).
6 Days - film about the SAS involvement in the Iranian Embassy siege in 1980
Who Dares Wins, 1982 film - released in the United States as The Final Option

Television shows about the SAS
SAS: Are You Tough Enough? (2002-2004)
SAS: Who Dares Wins – a reality quasi-military training television programme which pits contestants against harsh environments in a two-week-long training course that is designed to replicate Special Air Service selection
Ultimate Force – an ITV action drama series following the operations of the fictitious 'Red Troop' of the Special Air Service. (2002-2008)
SAS: Rogue Heroes – a BBC historical drama series which depicts the formation of the Special Air Service during World War II. (2022)

Alliances
 – Special Air Service Regiment
 – New Zealand Special Air Service

See also
List of military special forces units

References

Footnotes

Citations

Bibliography

External links 
 

 
1941 establishments in the United Kingdom
Airborne units and formations of the United Kingdom
Military counterterrorist organizations
Military units and formations established in 1941
Military units and formations of the Gulf War
Military units and formations of the Iraq War
Military units and formations of the United Kingdom in the Falklands War
Military units and formations of the United Kingdom in the War in Afghanistan (2001–2021)
Regiments of the British Army in World War II
Army reconnaissance units and formations